The State Register of Heritage Places is maintained by the Heritage Council of Western Australia. , 17 places are heritage-listed in the Shire of Jerramungup, of which three are on the State Register of Heritage Places.

List

State Register of Heritage Places
The Western Australian State Register of Heritage Places, lists the following three state registered places within the Shire of Jerramungup:

Shire of Jerramungup heritage-listed places
The following places are heritage listed in the Shire of Jerramungup but are not State registered:

References

Jerramungup
Jerramungup